Lape may refer to:

People
 Bob Lape (born 1933), American author
 Esther Lape (1881–1981), American journalist and publicist
 Lizzie Lape (1853–1917)

Places

Other
 LAPE, Spanish airline